The River is a  tall skyscraper in Bangkok, Thailand. On the banks of the Chao Phraya River opposite the Shangri-La Hotel, the building has around 70 floors of residential condominiums and was completed in 2011.

Developed by Raimon Land, the project consists of two buildings, a taller south tower adjacent to the river, and a slightly smaller north tower which is offset from the front tower so that both towers can enjoy river views.  The 74-floor The River South was the second tallest building in Thailand comprising entirely freehold condominiums and was the country tallest residential building.

The  45-floor north tower includes a mix of both freehold condominiums either owned or rented, and a section of the tower which is a serviced apartment operated by Klapsons, a Singapore hotel chain whose owner was also a major shareholder of Raimon Land. 14 out of 84 service apartment units were later sold as condominium units

Facilities include a 120 m river promenade, gym, several swimming pools, gardens, and adjacent community mall retail space at VUE, also owned and operated by Raimon Land, which opened in 2012. VUE was to be converted into hotel under the brand Kitch Hotel.

Awards 
The River has been recognized as a landmark development in Thailand, winning the prestigious Thailand Property Award "Best Luxury Condo Bangkok" Award in 2012, as well as "Best Condo Development" in the same year.

See also
List of tallest buildings in Thailand

References

External links

The River official website
The River Bangkok condo

Skyscrapers in Bangkok
Residential buildings completed in 2012
2012 establishments in Thailand
Residential skyscrapers in Thailand
Buildings and structures on the Chao Phraya River